Sikhism in the United Arab Emirates has a following of over 50,000; the majority of Sikhs in the UAE are found in Dubai and are expatriates hailing from India and Pakistan. 

The Sikh Gurdwara in Dubai, Guru Nanak Darbar, serves over 10,000 worshippers. In June 2010, foundations were laid for the Guru Nanak Darbar. At a cost of $20 million, the large gurdwara is located in Jebel Ali, Dubai and will be the first 'official' Sikh temple in the entire Gulf, catering to the needs of the local Sikh community. A community member and local businessman who proposed the gurdwara remarked "My dream is to make Guru Nanak Durbar the best, second only to the Golden Temple in Amritsar.

Gurunanak Darbar is modelled on both the Golden Temple and the gurdwara in Southall, London by Interior designer Paul Bishop. Apart from a large carpeted prayer hall, there are three smaller rooms for private functions, a meditation room, a library and the spacious 'langar' or common kitchen hall. The state-of-the-art kitchen can serve the 10,000 plus worshipers who come every Friday. 

To develop religious values among the next generation of NRIs, special three-hour sessions are held for children on Saturdays at the temple where they are taught Punjabi, 'Kirtans' and how to behave in places of worship.

References

External links
 Gurunanak Darbar Dubai
 Sikhs in Dubai